Malijan-e Pain (also Romanized as Malījān-e Pā’īn; also known as Malījān) is a village in Howmeh Rural District, in the Central District of Garmsar County, Semnan Province, Iran. At the 2006 census, its population was 84, in 21 families.

References 

Populated places in Garmsar County